Mount Wardle is a  mountain summit located in British Columbia, Canada.

Description
Mount Wardle is situated in Kootenay National Park at the southern end of the Vermilion Range, which is a sub-range of the Canadian Rockies. Mount Wardle is home to the largest population of mountain goats within the national park. Topographic relief is significant as the summit rises 1,600 meters (5,250 feet) above the Banff–Windermere Highway in three kilometers (1.9 mile). Mount Wardle is composed of Ottertail limestone, a sedimentary rock laid down during the Cambrian period and pushed east and over the top of younger rock during the Laramide orogeny. Precipitation runoff from the mountain drains east into Wardle Creek which is a tributary of the Vermilion River, and west into Lost Creek, a tributary of the Kootenay River.

History

The first ascent of the summit was made in 1922 by a Topographical Survey party. The mountain's toponym was applied by Morrison P. Bridgland (1878–1948), a Dominion Land Surveyor who named many peaks in the Canadian Rockies. It was officially adopted 9 September 1924 by the Geographical Names Board of Canada to honor James Morey Wardle (1888–1971), a highway design engineer and then-director of special projects for Parks Canada. Wardle also served as superintendent of Banff National Park from 1919 through 1921.

Climate

Based on the Köppen climate classification, Mount Wardle is located in a subarctic climate zone with cold, snowy winters, and mild summers. Winter temperatures can drop below −20 °C with wind chill factors below −30 °C.

Gallery

See also
 Geography of British Columbia

References

External links

 Weather: Mount Wardle
 Parks Canada web site: Kootenay National Park

Wardle
Wardle
Wardle
Wardle